Johnny Moeller (born Jon Kelly Moeller, October 31, 1970) is an American  guitarist, currently with The Fabulous Thunderbirds.

Born in Fort Worth, Texas, Johnny started playing guitar in his early teens. Over the years Moeller's main influences have been from Freddie King, Lightnin' Hopkins, Earl King and Grant Green to a wide variety of soul,  funk and rock artists.

He began playing in Dallas and Fort Worth blues clubs while still in high school. During the summers Moeller and his year and a younger brother Jay Moeller, who plays drums traveled from their home in Denton down to Austin. The summer they were 16 and 15 they meet Clifford Antone of the Austin blues club Antone's. The first night Moeller played on Antone's stage was with Little Charlie & The Nightcats.

After Moeller finished high school in Denton he moved to Austin Texas working in many of the city's well known venues and often soaked in the music of the constant stream of blues, and rock artists performing at  Antone's . Amongst those that played Antone's were Earl King, Albert Collins, and James Cotton.

Years later the Austin Chronicle quoted Clifford Antone (who also helped launch Stevie Ray Vaughan) as saying: "Johnny, nobody can burn like that kid. He's got the heart like Stevie had, about the only one I've seen with that kind of heart. Johnny's so quiet and bashful, just a sweet kid and sometimes those kids get overlooked."

By the time Moeller had joined The Fabulous Thunderbirds in mid-2007 he had toured North America, Europe, Australia, and Japan extensively. Johnny remains based in Austin, Texas with his wife Shontae Moeller and three children Estella, Calvin, and Lucille Moeller playing local, and regional venues when he is not touring with The Fabulous Thunderbirds.

Johnny Moeller is rumored to be the inspiration for one of the characters in Mike Judge's Beavis and Butt-Head cartoon. The other character is modeled after Paul Size.

Discography
Johnny Moeller, along with  friend Paul Size, later of The Red Devils (blues band), collaborated on a Dallas Blues Society Records release - Return of the Funky Worm (1996).
Along with Paul Size, worked with Mick Jagger on his still-unreleased album of traditional blues.
Johnny's Blues Aggregation, Dallas Blues Society Records, (2001)
Bloogaloo, Severn Records. (2010)

References

1970 births
Living people
People from Fort Worth, Texas
American blues guitarists
American male guitarists
Guitarists from Texas
The Fabulous Thunderbirds members
21st-century American guitarists
21st-century American male musicians